Médéric Collignon (born 6 July 1970 in Villers-Semeuse, Ardennes) is a French jazz vocalist, cornettist and saxhorn player.

He learnt to play the trumpet at the age of five, became a pupil at the Conservatoire de Charleville-Mézières in 1984, and gained his diploma at the Conservatoire de Nancy in 1989. In 2009 he was awarded the Django Reinhardt prize by the Académie du Jazz.

He has been influenced by various genres, including funk, hard rock, jazz-rock and the music of Olivier Messiaen.

Discography

As leader
 2006 Porgy and Bess, Discograph
 2010 Shangri-Tunkashi-La, Plus Loin Music
 2012 À la recherche du roi frippé, Just Looking

As sideman 
 2001 Sereine, Label Bleu, with Claude Barthélémy
 2003 Admirabelamour, Label Bleu, with the Orchestre national de jazz conducted by Claude Barthélémy
 2003 Napoli's Walls, ECM, with Louis Sclavis
 2005 "Lunfardo", record label Chief Inspector (200509), Sébastien Gaxie
 2007 Bamana, Act Music, with Soriba Kouyaté

References

External links 
Médéric Collignon at OC-TV (in French)

1970 births
Living people
French jazz saxophonists
Orchestre National de Jazz members